Nationality words link to articles with information on the nation's poetry or literature (for instance, Irish or France).

Events

Works published

Great Britain
 Robert Aylet:
 Peace with Her Foure Garders: Five morall meditations
 Thrifts Equipage: Five divine and morall meditations
 Sir John Davies, Nosce Teipsum (see also Nosce Teipsum 1599, 1619)
 Michael Drayton, The Second Part, or a Continuance of Poly-Olbion from the Eighteenth Song (see Poly-Olbion, Part 1, 1612)
 John Hagthorpe, Divine Meditations, and Elegies
 Patrick Hannay, The Nightingale, Sheretine and Mariana. A Happy Husband. Eligies on the Death of Queene Anne. Songs and Sonnets. (A Happy Husband first published separately in 1619 with Richard Brathwait's Description of a Good Wife; Elegies on Queene Anne also published separately in 1619)

 Abraham Holland, Naumachia; or, Holland's sea-fight
 Samuel Rowlands, Good News and Bad Newes
 John Taylor, A Memorial of all the English Monarchs
 George Wither:
 Faire-Virtue, the Mistresse of Phil'arete
 Juvenilia

Other
 Ivan Gundulić, Tears of the Prodigal Son, Croatian work published in Venice, Italy
 Theophile de Viau, Le Parnasse satyrique, a collection of licentious poems, published under his name, although many of the pieces were written by others; the publication led to de Viau's denunciation by the Jesuits in 1623 and a death sentence, later amended to exile within France; France
 John of the Cross (died 1591), Spiritual Canticle, Spanish mystical poem, largely written in 1577, first published, in French translation in Paris
 Pang Tat, called Neak Pang, The Poem of Angkor Wat, Khmer epic inscribed in Cambodia
 Alessandro Tassoni, La secchia rapita ("The Rape of the Bucket"), a mock-heroic epic poem; Italy

Births
Death years link to the corresponding "[year] in poetry" article:
 January 15 – Molière (died 1673), French playwright, poet and actor
 March 28 – Ermes di Colorêt (died 1692), Friulian courtier and poet
 Francesc Fontanella (died 1685), Catalan poet, dramatist and priest
 Luo Mu (died 1706), Chinese painter, poet and prose writer

Deaths
Birth years link to the corresponding "[year] in poetry" article:
 June 4 – Péter Révay (born 1568), Hungarian poet, nobleman, Royal Crown Guard for the Holy Crown of Hungary, state official, soldier and historian
 August 21 – Juan de Tassis, 2nd Count of Villamediana (born 1582), Spanish
 November 4 – Francisco Rodrigues Lobo (born 1580), Portuguese poet and bucolic writer, drowned
 December 13 – Johannes Vodnianus Campanus (born 1572), Czech poet and playwright
 John Owen (born 1560), Welsh poet and epigrammatist writing in Latin
 Mathew Roydon (born 1580), English poet associated with the School of Night group of poets and writers

See also

 Poetry
 16th century in poetry
 16th century in literature

Notes

17th-century poetry
Poetry